The Chengkungling History Museum is a museum in Chengkungling, a military training centre in Wuri District, Taichung, Taiwan.

See also
 List of museums in Taiwan

References

Military and war museums in Taiwan
Museums in Taichung